Thelma Alicia Parapar (8 March 1926 – 23 September 1998), known by her stage name Thelma del Río, was an Argentine film, stage and television actress, as well as a noted vedette.

Thelma Alicia Parapar was born in Buenos Aires. She worked as in the theatre with Carlos A. Petit, Adolfo Stray and Nelida Roca. A victim of breast cancer, she died in Buenos Aires in 1998 and was buried in La Chacarita Cemetery.

Filmography 
 1956: Estrellas de Buenos Aires
 1958: Las Apariencias engañan
 1960: El asalto
 1968: Asalto a la ciudad
 1972: Las píldoras
 1979: La carpa del amor
 1988: Paraíso relax

Television 
 1952: Telesolfas musicales
 1953: El hombre de aquella noche
 1965: Teleteatro en Canal 7
 1965: La matraca
 1965: Todo es amor
 1981: Comedias para vivir
 1982: La comedia del domingo
 1982: Gracias doctor
 1984: Historias de un trepador
 1986: Claudia Morán
 1989/1995: La familia Benvenuto
 1990: La pensión de la Porota
 1991: Regalo del cielo
 1998: Rapidísimo

References

External links 

1926 births
1998 deaths
Argentine film actresses
Argentine stage actresses
Argentine television actresses
Deaths from cancer in Argentina
Deaths from breast cancer
Burials at La Chacarita Cemetery
Argentine vedettes